Ramey Dawoud is a Sudanese-American retired rapper, actor, songwriter, activist and author. He is of Nubian descent and his family originates from the Nubian town of  Wadi Halfa, Sudan. Ramey Dawoud's music is known for its lyrics highlighting life in the diaspora. He is perhaps best known for his starring role in the award winning short film, Faisal Goes West (2013).

In 2021, Dawoud collaborated with Taras Press to participate in the "Read, Write, and Count in Nubian: ⲅⲉⲣⲓ, ⲫⲁ̄ⲓ̈, ⲟ̄ⲙⲓⲣ!" Kickstarter campaign to publish four books written in Nubian languages to encourage literacy in the Nubian alphabet, for which he wrote and published Nabra's Nubian Numbers, a children's book written in Nobiin and English which teaches Nobiin numbers and incorporates various references to Nubian culture.

Discography
 Albums/EPs
 Diary Of A Menace (2008) 
 Reflections EP (2013) 
 Kashta (2017)
 I Am Because We Are (2018)
 Lost In The Attic (2021)

Filmography

References

1991 births
Living people
American male film actors
American male songwriters
American male poets
21st-century American poets
21st-century American male actors
American people of Sudanese descent
21st-century American male writers
Nubian people